Kimsa Llallawa (Aymara kimsa three, llallawa a monstrous potato (like two potatoes) or animal, also spelled Quimsa Llallagua) is a  mountain in the Bolivian Andes. It is located in the La Paz Department, Inquisivi Province, Colquiri Municipality, east of Colquiri.

References 

Mountains of La Paz Department (Bolivia)